The Alameda County Open was a golf tournament on the PGA Tour that was held from January 9–12, 1969 at the Sunol Valley Golf Club's Palm course in Sunol, California. The event was won by hometowner Dick Lotz, then 26 years old, by one-stroke over Don Whitt. The winning score was 290 (two-over-par).

Winners

References

Former PGA Tour events
Golf in California
Sports in the San Francisco Bay Area
1969 establishments in California
1969 disestablishments in California